Kantabania Sasana is a village under the Nayagarh district, Odisha, India. The village is only 9 km from the district headquarters, It is flawlessly connected by road to Nayagarh and other nearby towns and villages. Kantabanian are well educated and talented. Agriculture, Teaching, Puja and Rituals were the main profession of Kantabanian in 1980s and 1990s. Now Many Kantabanian are settled in state capital Bhubaneswar. Young kantabanian are working across the globe.

References

External links

Villages in Nayagarh district